Truce is a 1982 studio album by Jack Bruce and Robin Trower. It reached number 109 on the Billboard 200

Track listing

Side one
"Gonna Shut You Down" (Trower, Keith Reid) - 3:03
"Gone Too Far" (Trower, Reid) - 3:48
"Thin Ice" (Pete Brown, Bruce) - 3:40
"Last Train to the Stars" (Trower, Brown, Bruce) - 3:21
"Take Good Care of Yourself" (Trower, Reid) - 4:44

Side two
"Fall in Love" (Trower, Reid) - 2:39
"Fat Gut" (Brown, Bruce) - 3:21
"Shadows Touching" (Brown, Bruce) - 4:28
"Little Boy Lost" (Trower, Reid) - 3:32

Personnel 
 Robin Trower - guitar, producer
 Jack Bruce - bass, vocals, keyboards, producer
 Reg Isidore - drums
Technical
 Ike Nassau - recording engineer

References

1982 albums
Robin Trower albums
Jack Bruce albums
Chrysalis Records albums